Aa Family Comedy Che is a Gujarati sitcom TV serial, which aired on Colors Gujarati. It is produced by SanGo Telefilms. The show premiered on 3 November 2014 on ETV Gujarati. Music for the serial is given by Parth - Kirtan.

Plot summary

Aa Family Comedy Che revolves around daily happenings between two neighbor families, the Jobanputra family and Shashtri Family. The characters have their unique identities, including a boy with unique business ideas, a lady with various unique cooking recipes, a psychiatrist, an anger management professor, an army officer etc. The plot revolves around rivalries between two characters of these two families. And the mistakes they do add an awesome flavor of comedy. Watch two neighbors fronted by two young ladies at logger heads with each other, when the families become one in a marriage and both commanders in charge become Nanand and Bhabhi.

Cast
 Vimmy Bhatt - As Disha Shashtri
 Puja Joshi - As Charu Parth Shashtri (Daughter of Mr. Abhyankar)
 Leena Shah - As Charu Parth Shashtri (From Episode No. 319)
 Vinayak Ketkar - As Mr. Divakar Shashtri
 Tushar Kapadia - As Mr. Abhyankar Jobanputra
 Krishna Oza - As Mrs. Vidya Shashtri
 Bhaskar Bhojak - As Parth Shashtri(son of Mr Shashtri) & Pappubhai 
 Parth Thaker - As Sandeep Jobanputra

Guest Appearance
 Mr. Sanjay Goradia - As Lucky Lottery Vendor/Motabha/Mansukh Motiwala
 Mr. Arvind Rathod - As Himself
 Padmarani - As Herself
 Kishore Bhanushali - As Johnny
 Jagesh Mukati - As Kalubhai Builder
 Smit Pandya - As Gunu 
 Paresh Bhatt - As Amit Kulkarni (Parth's Patient)
 Saheb Trivedi - As Babu A.K.A Bakul Khan
 Pratik Patel - As Pratik
 Vikram Mehta - As Sanju
 Vimal Patel - As Mama A.K.A Mavjibhai Marfatiya

External links 
YouTube channel

Indian comedy television series
Indian drama television series
Colors Gujarati original programming
Gujarati-language television shows